Zimen Inlet (‘Zimenski Zaliv’ \'zi-men-ski 'za-liv\) is the 12.8 km wide inlet indenting for 9.3 km the east coast of Churchill Peninsula, Oscar II Coast in Graham Land.  It is part of Adie Inlet entered south of Slav Point and north of Cavarus Point.  The feature is named after the settlement of Zimen in Southeastern Bulgaria.

Location
British mapping in 1974.

Maps

 British Antarctic Territory: Graham Land.  Scale 1:250000 topographic map.  BAS 250 Series, Sheet SQ 19–20.  London, 1974.
 Antarctic Digital Database (ADD). Scale 1:250000 topographic map of Antarctica. Scientific Committee on Antarctic Research (SCAR), 1993–2016.

References
 Zimen Inlet. SCAR Composite Antarctic Gazetteer.
 Bulgarian Antarctic Gazetteer. Antarctic Place-names Commission. (details in Bulgarian, basic data in English)

External links
 Zimen Inlet. Copernix satellite image

Inlets of Graham Land
Oscar II Coast
Bulgaria and the Antarctic